The 1982 San Marino Grand Prix  was a Formula One motor race held on 25 April 1982 at the Autodromo Dino Ferrari, Imola, Italy. It was the fourth race of the 1982 Formula One World Championship.

The race was boycotted by many teams as part of a political war, unrelated to the event itself, involving the two dominant forces within Formula One, the Fédération Internationale du Sport Automobile (FISA) and the Formula One Constructors' Association (FOCA). Only seven teams took part, giving a field of 14 cars.

The 60-lap race was won by Frenchman Didier Pironi, driving a Ferrari, with Canadian teammate Gilles Villeneuve second and Italian Michele Alboreto third in a Tyrrell-Ford. After the Renaults of René Arnoux and Alain Prost retired, Villeneuve led from Pironi before the Ferrari team ordered both drivers to slow down, with Alboreto far behind. Villeneuve interpreted this as an order to maintain position on the track; Pironi did not and thus overtook Villeneuve on the final lap, infuriating the Canadian to the point that he vowed never to speak to Pironi again. Villeneuve would lose his life in a crash during qualifying for the Belgian Grand Prix two weeks later.

Summary 

In a decision relating to the 1982 Brazilian Grand Prix, Nelson Piquet and Keke Rosberg were excluded for their cars' use of water tanks as ballast to keep them under the weight limit during race conditions. The Formula One Constructors' Association (FOCA) protested, and took the decision to boycott the 1982 San Marino Grand Prix.

Most of the FOCA-aligned teams, including Brabham, McLaren, Williams and Lotus, boycotted the race. However, the Tyrrell, Osella, ATS and Toleman teams broke the boycott, citing "sponsor obligations". They joined the FISA-aligned Ferrari, Renault and Alfa Romeo teams in the race, giving a total of 14 cars.

The Renaults of René Arnoux and Alain Prost qualified first and second, but their cars failed in the race, leaving Ferrari occupying the top two positions with Gilles Villeneuve leading Didier Pironi. The third-placed Tyrrell of Michele Alboreto was far behind, so Ferrari ordered their drivers to slow down to minimize the risk of mechanical failure or running out of fuel. Villeneuve believed this order also meant that the cars were to maintain position on the track, with Villeneuve ahead of Pironi. However, Pironi believed that the cars were free to race, and passed Villeneuve. Villeneuve believed that Pironi was simply trying to spice up an otherwise dull race, and duly re-passed his teammate, assuming that he would then hold station for the remainder of the race. Thus, Villeneuve failed to protect the inside line going into the Tosa corner on the final lap, and Pironi passed him to take the win. Villeneuve was irate at what he saw as Pironi's betrayal, although opinion inside the Ferrari team was split over the true meaning of the order to slow down. Villeneuve's expression was sullen on the podium, enraged by Pironi's actions. He was quoted afterwards as saying, "I'll never speak to Pironi again in my life." They proved to be prophetic words, as he was still not on speaking terms with his teammate when he died during qualifying for the Belgian Grand Prix two weeks later. Pironi's pass on Villeneuve is considered to be one of the most controversial moments in Formula One.

Manfred Winkelhock was disqualified for his car being underweight in post-race scrutineering.

Despite most of the FOCA-aligned teams boycotting the race it still counted towards the World Championship. This was a bone of contention with the FOCA teams as two previous races held during the war (the 1980 Spanish Grand Prix and the 1981 South African Grand Prix) which had seen all three manufacturer teams boycotting had been down-graded to non-championship races and had not counted towards the championship or official records.

Classification

Qualifying

Race

Championship standings after the race

Drivers' Championship standings

Constructors' Championship standings

References

San Marino Grand Prix
San Marino Grand Prix
San Marino Grand Prix
Formula One controversies